Willem or Guiliam van Nieulandt, sometimes Nieuwelandt (1584–1635) was a Dutch Golden Age painter, engraver, poet and playwright from Antwerp.

Biography

His father Adrien van Nieulandt the elder was born to a family of artists of Flemish origin from Antwerp. He moved with his family to Amsterdam in 1589, after the Siege of Antwerp, probably because they were Protestants. His three sons Willem van Nieulandt II (named for his uncle, also a painter), Adriaen van Nieulandt the younger, and Jacob van Nieulandt all became painters.

Willem was a pupil of Roelant Savery in 1599, and in 1601 he travelled to Rome, where he became a student of Paulus Bril. According to Arnold Houbraken, he specialized in painting artistic ruins of monuments, arches, and temples, many of which he then engraved himself. In Spring 1606 the 22-year-old married Anna Hustaert in Amsterdam, but the couple settled in Antwerp.

Nieulandt was better known as a poet and playwright than as a painter. He was a member of the Antwerp chamber of rhetoric the Olyftack (Olive Branch) from 1613 to 1621, transferring to the rival Violieren from 1621 to 1629. In May 1620 he won the prize for best poem at a rhetoric competition in Mechelen, writing under the pen name Dient uwen Al (Serve your All). In May 1624 the Violieren produced his play Aegyptica (a tragedy on the theme of Anthony and Cleopatra). His daughter Constantia, who later married Adriaen van Utrecht, was likewise a well regarded poet.

At some point after May 1629 he returned to Amsterdam, where he lived until his death in 1635.

Literary works

Poetry
 Poëma van den Mensch (1621)

Drama
 Livia (1617)
 Saul (1617)
 Claudius Domitius Nero (1618)
 Aegyptica (1624)
 Sophonisba Aphricana (1626, 1635)
 Salomon (1628)
 Jerusalems Verwoestingh door Nabuchodonosor (1635)

Public collections
 Norton Museum of Art, West Palm Beach
 Museum of Fine Arts (Budapest), Budapest
 Pushkin Museum, Moscow
 Musée des Beaux-Arts de Tours, Tours

References

External links

 Web Gallery of Art biography
RKD mentions Jacob Savery as teacher

1584 births
1635 deaths
Dutch Golden Age painters
Dutch male painters
Painters from Amsterdam
Writers from Amsterdam
17th-century Dutch dramatists and playwrights